The Fairmont Monte Carlo is a luxury resort located in Monte Carlo managed by the Canadian-based hotel chain Fairmont Hotels and Resorts. It is built within sight of the Circuit de Monaco hairpin.

History
Construction of the hotel was completed in the early 1970s. The hotel was built on the spot of the first Monegasque railway station, by the real estate development company Caroli Group. As it stands today, there is still a section of the original station wall hidden in one of the hotel's offices. Instead of building the hotel up the rocks, the property is partially built into the Mediterranean coast. The hotel opened in August 1975, managed by Loews Hotels, as Loews Monte-Carlo. In 1998, Toufic Aboukhater bought the hotel from Loews Hotels Holding Corporation for an undisclosed price and renamed it the Monte Carlo Grand Hotel.

In 2004 the hotel was acquired by Fairmont Hotels and Resorts for 215 million euro It was the first purchase by a joint venture of Fairmont, Kingdom Hotels International and Bank of Scotland Corporate. and renamed Fairmont Monte Carlo. The hotel was renovated in 2005 and again in 2009.

During the annual Formula 1 racing event on Circuit de Monaco, the racers make use of the tunnel under the hotel which is considered one of the most dangerous parts of the circuit. One of the corners is still named after the previous hotel name, the Grand Hotel. The hotel overlooks a hair-pin bend that is considered to be one of the most dramatic parts of the Grand Prix circuit.

See also 
 Monaco

References

External links

Fairmont Hotels and Resorts
Hotels in Monaco
Hotels established in 1975
Hotel buildings completed in 1975
1975 establishments in Monaco